Fratte Rosa is a comune (municipality) in the Province of Pesaro e Urbino in the Italian region Marche, located about  west of Ancona and about  south of Pesaro.

References

External links
 Official website

Cities and towns in the Marche